The Rusa (Rusha) language, also known as Arusha-Chini, is one of the Bantu languages of Tanzania spoken by the Chaga people. It is spoken in the Chaga area of the Kilimanjaro region, and forms a dialect continuum with other Chaga languages.

References

Languages of Tanzania
Chaga languages